The Office for Life Sciences (OLS) is part of the British government. The organisation supports the delivery of the UK Government's life sciences and innovation policy by connecting decision making across government. Informed by productive engagement with industry, the OLS is the internal champion of research, innovation, and technology within government for the improvement of healthcare.

The office sits across the Department for Business, Energy and Industrial Strategy and the Department of Health and Social Care, reporting to the Minister for Business and Industry and the Minister for Innovation.

History
The Office for Life Sciences was created in 2009 following an announcement by UK Prime Minister Gordon Brown on the establishment of a new cross-government unit to drive forward innovation within the healthcare system, and to support national policy making on the UK's attractiveness as a market for medicines and medical devices and technologies. The OLS was supported through its inception by Lord Drayson as Minister of State for Science and Innovation.

Leadership 
The leadership is as follows:

Strategy

Life Sciences Blueprint (2009–2010) 
The Life Sciences Blueprint, published in July 2009, set out a vision for UK life sciences policy which the OLS was tasked with supporting. The blueprint focused on:
 Strengthening the NHS champion for innovation
 Building a more integrated life sciences strategy
 Ensuring access to finance and stimulating investment
 Marketing the UK's life sciences industry internationally.

Strategy for UK Life Sciences (2011–2017) 
The Strategy for UK Life Sciences was published in December 2011 and led by the Department for Business, Innovation and Skills and Department of Health. The paper was one of the first policy documents on life sciences under the Conservative-Liberal Democrat coalition government, which expanded upon the work of the previous Labour administration in building the UK's life sciences clout. The strategy outlined an agenda for regulatory and medicines access reform to boost UK attractiveness and to deliver greater innovation within the NHS and the wider healthcare system.

Life Sciences Industrial Strategy (2017–2021) 
The UK's Industrial Strategy is a core legacy of Theresa May's premiership which sets out a move towards a more interventionist industrial agenda than that of her Conservative predecessors. With life sciences recognised as a key sector of the Industrial Strategy, Professor Sir John Bell was asked to formulate a specific strategy for the sector. The Life Sciences Industrial Strategy was split into seven main themes and made several recommendations to expand and grow the UK's scientific and research base. 

The Life Sciences Industrial Strategy was accompanied by two negotiated 'sector deals', a type of bespoke arrangement between government and industry, which agreed specific-shared innovation priorities, including the commitment to scale-up the UK's genomic sequencing capabilities. In January 2020, an update to the strategy was published by the UK Government which examined the progress to date in achieving the 2017 vision.

Plan for Growth (2021–present) 
In March 2021, it was announced that the UK Government would introduce a new plan for growth to replace the Industrial Strategy. In an open letter to businesses, Chancellor Rishi Sunak and Business Secretary Kwasi Kwarteng set out the government's vision for the Plan for Growth which would take advantage of COVID-19 recovery planning to deliver the ambitions of the 2019 Conservative Party manifesto. The plan is the legacy of Downing Street advisor Dominic Cummings which seeks to place technology and innovation at the heart of the UK’s economic future. The Plan for Growth continues elements of the Industrial Strategy, including the Life Science Sector Deals, and policy specific proposals will be made within 12 months of its publication.

References

External links
 

Biology organisations based in the United Kingdom
Department for Business, Energy and Industrial Strategy
Innovation in the United Kingdom
Science and technology in the United Kingdom
2009 establishments in the United Kingdom